Red Line 7 of the Mumbai Metro is part of the metro system for the city of Mumbai, India. The  section of red line from Aarey Flyover to Gundavli(Andheri East) was inaugurated on January 19, 2023.
The line is served by 22 six-car trains built in India by Bharat Earth Movers. The trains have a design speed of 70km/h, and carry 2280 passengers each, operating at 10-minute intervals.

Planning
In February 2017, the MMRDA announced that the DMRC was preparing a detailed project report (DPR) on Red line extension, a proposed  extension of Red Line from Dahisar to Bhayander, via Mira Road. Preliminary plans prepared jointly by MMRDA and DMRC, proposed a  elevated extension of Red Line from Dahisar to Bhayander, via Mira Road. The line will run parallel to the Surat-Dahisar Highway, then turn left at Kashi Mira Junction, before passing through Mira Road-Bhayander, and terminating at Golden Nest Circle, Bhayander. The project is estimated to cost . The extension was approved by the Maharashtra government in September 2018, and will be implemented as Red line extension.

In March 2017, the MMRDA stated that the DMRC was conducting a feasibility study to extend the line to the T2 terminal of the airport. The proposed  extension from Andheri to the domestic airport will pass beneath Blue Line's WEH station and is expected to cost between Rs 1,500 and 2,000 crore. The extensions to Mira Road and the airport were officially announced by Chief Minister Fadnavis on 30 March 2017. The alignment for the extension from Andheri to Chhatrapati Shivaji Maharaj International Terminus was approved by the State Cabinet on 12 April 2017. The  includes a  elevated stretch and  tunnel. The Maharashtra Cabinet approved the implementation of the extension, called Red line Airport extension, in September 2018. Work on Airport extension was expected to begin by April 2019. However, work began in early 2020 with an aim to complete by December 2021.

In April 2017, the Civil Aviation Ministry provided 40 acres of land in Dahisar for the construction of the metro depot.

Construction
The bhoomipujan ceremony for Line 7 was performed by Prime Minister Narendra Modi during his visit to Mumbai in October 2015. Line 7 is being implemented through the engineering, procurement and construction (EPC) model. The project is estimated to cost . Bids for the design and construction of the corridor were split into 3 packages, and awarded by the MMRDA in April 2016.

Construction work on the corridor began on 8 August 2016. The project is expected to be completed by mid-2020. The contractors are likely to complete construction of the corridor and all 14 stations within 30 months from the day of commencement of work. On 18 February 2017, MMRDA officials stated that 15% of piling, pile caps and pier work on the corridor had been completed. By the end of April, 25% of piling work, 60% of barricading work and 77% of the soil testing for pier foundation had been completed.

On 14 March 2017, the Mumbai High Court temporarily stayed all construction activities at Metro 7's casting yard in Bandra Reclamation. The Court was hearing a PIL filed by Mohammed Furqan Ali Mohammed Qureshi who alleged that the site of the casting yard had been reserved by the Brihanmumbai Municipal Corporation (BMC) for use as a Sunni Muslim cemetery. Piling work in Kandivli resulted in a gas pipeline bursting on 29 March 2017. The damage to the Mahanagar Gas pipeline resulted in temporary disruptions in the supply of CNG to Kandivli, Borivli, Dahisar, Mira Road and Bhayander. Mahanagar Gas began repairing the pipeline on the evening of 31 March, and completed the work by the following evening.

The MMRDA announced that construction of viaducts would begin in April 2017. The agency had completed construction of piers on several sections of the corridor, and the viaducts will be built at locations where pier caps have been built. The first viaduct was constructed in the section between JVLR to Mahanand. Construction of all pier caps along the corridor will be completed by the end of 2017. The first U-girder, the concrete structure on which metro tracks are laid, was launched near Pathanwadi Junction in Malad on 2 May 2017. In total, Metro 7 required 1,400 U-girders. Work on erecting the U-girders, as well as disposal and dumping of muck generated from underground work is done only between 11:30 pm and 6:00 am. During this period, multi-axle trailers transport a U-girder weighing 170 tonne from the casting yard in Bandra to location where it is to be erected. The trailer must move slowly to avoid causing imbalance to the heavy load which can result in toppling, and takes roughly two hours to complete the journey. Lifting the girder and attaching it to the pier caps is also a difficult process and is carried out at night time. Traffic diversions are placed around the launching site to reduce the possibility of accidents. Officials erect an average of two girders every day.

Current Status for Line 7

Metro 7 red line is expected to start operations in Jan-Feb 2022. Trial runs on section of 7 from Aarey to Dahisar East has started from 31 May 2021.

Current Status for Line 7A

Funding
Line 7 is estimated to cost . The Asian Development Bank (ADB) will provide 43-48% of the total project cost through a loan at an interest rate of 1.4%. The Government of Maharashtra is the guarantor for the loan. On 2 March 2019, the Union Ministry of Finance stated that it signed a $926 million loan agreement with the ADB to fund the construction of Metro 2 and 7. This was the single largest infrastructure loan ever extended by the ADB. The funds will be used to procure 63 six-car trainsets and for signaling and safety systems on both corridors.

The proposed extension of Line 7 from Dahisar to Bhayander is estimated to cost , and the underground extension to the International Airport shall cost an additional .

Stations

Red Line 7 
14 stations are under operation as of 19 January 2023.

Red Line 7A 

2 stations are being planned on Line 7A connecting Gundavali to CSIA (Chhatrapati Shivaji International Airport).

Infrastructure
In April 2019, the MMRDA issued tenders for the rooftop solar PV power projects at stations on Line 7.

Over the course of two weeks in March–April 2017, Mumbai residents saved nearly 4,000 trees planted on dividers and along the WEH that had been planned to be felled for metro construction. Residents replanted these trees at their own housing societies, as well as schools and other locations. Nearly 210 people and over 40 housing societies participated in the initiative coordinating their efforts through Whatsapp messages.

Rolling stock
The MMRDA allotted  to the DMRC to implement and commission rolling stock, signalling and telecommunication work for the Metro 2A and Metro 7 corridors on 26 November 2016.

After floating tenders Companies including Alstom India, Bombardier, CRRC Zhouzhou, CRRC Nanjing, CRRC Puzen, BEML India Ltd, Hyundai Rotem, etc. Eventually BEML India limited won the Contract of ₹  3640 Crore to supply 378 coaches comprising 63 Trains Sets of 6 car driverless configuration. MMRDA  ordered additional 21 Six Car train sets from BEML in early 2020.

Fare collection
A consortium of Indian company Datamatics and Italian company AEP Ticketing solutions S.R.L was awarded a  contract to implement the automated fare collection system for Metro 7 and Metro 2 in February 2019.

References

Mumbai Metro lines
25 kV AC railway electrification